Lloyd Dugger (1926–May 26, 2005), better known as Doug Dugger, was an American country music singer with a religious style that led him to be dubbed the "Chaplain of Country Music."  His hits included "Bummin' Around" and "The Deck of Cards".

As a boy in Missouri, Dugger played banjo and sang. He was discharged from the US Navy in 1946 and moved to Missoula, Montana, where he attended a T. Texas Tyler show at an American Legion post and was invited to play with the band informally. The group then hired him as a bass player.

Dugger toured with Tyler until 1956, when he signed with Top Talent, Inc. and appeared and toured with ABC-TV's Ozark Jubilee. He was the co-host and executive producer of a syndicated weekly radio program, Legends and Legends in the Making, which featured country stars and new talent.

In 2003, the Country Legends Association Hall of Fame inducted him as a "living legend." Dugger died of congestive heart failure at his home in Missoula on May 26, 2005.

References

Obituaries (May 30, 2005), The Baltimore Sun

1926 births
2005 deaths
American country singer-songwriters
People from Missouri
20th-century American singers
Country musicians from Missouri
Singer-songwriters from Missouri